The Monroe County Courthouse is located in Woodsfield, Ohio and is one of few courthouses located in a town square. It is the fourth courthouse building on this site, with two of the previous ones destroyed in fires. The present building is of red brick with yellow brick quoins, pillars and pediments, which are said to represent the colors of fall in the surrounding countryside. The main entrance is reached by a small flight of stairs between Ionic columns and a pediment of fine arched stone.

The courthouse has one of ten largest clocks in the world, which can be seen from miles away. Its four faces were installed in 1908 by Howard Clock Company of New York. The cost of the clock was $2,775.

The dome of the courthouse was once a bright copper plating, but was removed due to public dissatisfaction.

The present courthouse is still used for judicial purposes, housing both criminal and civil proceedings as well as probate and juvenile matters.

References

Further reading
County Courthouses of Ohio by Susan W. Thrane

External links

Courthouses on the National Register of Historic Places in Ohio
Buildings and structures in Monroe County, Ohio
National Register of Historic Places in Monroe County, Ohio
County courthouses in Ohio
Neoclassical architecture in Ohio
Government buildings completed in 1905
Samuel Hannaford buildings
Clock towers in Ohio
1905 establishments in Ohio